Emma Sofia Helistén (born 11 May 1989 in Helsinki) is a Finnish tennis player.

Helistén played one rubber for Finland at the 2007 Fed Cup, a play-off match in which she lost in straight sets to Bosnia's Dijana Stojić.

Fed Cup participation

Singles

References

External links 

 
 
 

1989 births
Living people
Sportspeople from Helsinki
Finnish female tennis players
Tulane Green Wave women's tennis players
20th-century Finnish women
21st-century Finnish women